{{DISPLAYTITLE:C16H14F3N3O2S}}
The molecular formula C16H14F3N3O2S (molar mass: 369.363 g/mol) may refer to:

 Dexlansoprazole
 Lansoprazole

Molecular formulas